"Lift Him Up That's All" is a gospel blues song recorded in 1927 by Washington Phillips.  It is a solo performance, with Phillips' vocals and zither.

Description 
The verses tell the story of Jesus and the Samaritan woman at the well, found in the Gospel of John at 4:4-30.

The refrain draws from the Gospel of John at 12:32, often interpreted as a prophecy of the Crucifixion and/or the Resurrection of Jesus:

and runs as follows:

The song seems to have fallen into obscurity until revived in 2002 by the bluegrass musician Ralph Stanley.

Recordings 
 1927Washington Phillips, Columbia Records single 
 Blind Benny Paris and Wife, Victor Records(?) single
 2002Ralph Stanley, "Lift Him Up, That's All"  on the album Ralph Stanley
 2011 Ralph Stanley, "Lift Him Up, That's All"  on the album A Mother's Prayer

Other songs 
The refrain has some resemblances to that of the 1903 hymn "Lift Him Up" by Johnson Oatman, Jr., but the music and verses are different.

See also 
 "Jesus Met the Woman at the Well", a different gospel song on the same Biblical story

References 

Blues songs
Gospel songs
Washington Phillips songs
1927 songs
Columbia Records singles
Songwriter unknown
Songs about Jesus
Songs based on the Bible